The 2012–13 Irapuato season is the 18th professional season of Mexico's Promotion league. The season is split into two tournaments—the Torneo Apertura and the Torneo Clausura—each with identical formats and each contested by the same fifteen teams. Irapuato began their season in a 0-0 draw on July 20, 2012 against Tecos, Irapuato play their homes games in the Estadio Sergio León Chávez.

Torneo Apertura 2012

Squad

 (Captain)
 (Vice Captain)

Regular season

Apertura 2012 results

Goalscorers

Results

Results summary

Copa MX

Group stage

Apertura results

Goalscorers

Transfers

In

Out

Torneo Clausura 2013

Squad

Regular season

Clausura 2013 results

Copa MX

Group 3

Matches

Transfers

In

References

Ascenso MX seasons
Mexican football clubs 2012–13 season